Rajat Rawail  is an Indian film producer, director and actor working in the Hindi film industry. He is best known as the producer of films such as No Problem (2010) and Ready (2011).

Early life and family
Rawail was born and brought up in Mumbai. He is the grandson of legendary filmmaker H. S. Rawail and the nephew of film director Rahul Rawail He completed his schooling from Maneckji Cooper School, Juhu, Mumbai in 1987.

Career
Rawail started his career as an assistant director to director Ramesh Sippy. Starting with Bhrashtachar (1989), Rawail worked with Sippy in Akayla (1991) followed by Zamaana Deewana (1995). Subsequently, he has worked as a producer and co-producer for Hindi films like Ready, No Problem, Shortkut - The Con is On, Run and Anjaam.

As a producer he co-produced Salman Khan starrer Ready (2011), a remake of 2008 Telugu film by the same name, and No Problem. He had been planning to make a remake of Kaalia, but later dropped the idea

He made his acting debut in Salman Khan starrer, Bodyguard (2011) playing a fun loving character, Tsunami Singh. In 2013, he became a contestant in the reality TV Show Bigg Boss 7.

Personal life
He is married to  Bhavna Dhowan Rawail, and the couple has a daughter named Gehna..

Filmography

Films

As actor

Television

References

External links
 

Film producers from Mumbai
Living people
Male actors from Mumbai
Hindi film producers
Male actors in Hindi cinema
Hindi-language film directors
21st-century Indian male actors
Bigg Boss (Hindi TV series) contestants
1972 births